Ricardo Montero (9 July 1902 – 19 December 1974) was a Spanish racing cyclist. In 1925 he won the Vuelta a Andalucía.

Major results

1925
 1st  Road race, National Road Championships
 1st Overall Vuelta a Andalucía
1st Stage 1
1926
 1st Overall Vuelta Asturias
1st Stages 1, 2 & 3
 1st GP Vizcaya
 1st Prueba Loinaz
 3rd Road race, National Road Championships
 3rd GP Villafranca de Ordizia
1927
 1st GP Villafranca de Ordizia
 1st GP Pascuas
 1st GP Vizcaya
 2nd Overall Vuelta Asturias
 7th Overall Tour of the Basque Country
1928
 1st Overall Vuelta Asturias
 3rd Clásica a los Puertos de Guadarrama
 4th Road race, National Road Championships
 5th Overall Tour of the Basque Country
1st Stage 1
1929
 1st Prueba Legazpia
1930
 1st GP Villafranca de Ordizia
 1st Stage 2 Tour of the Basque Country
 1st Prueba Legazpia
 3rd Overall Volta a Catalunya
1st Stage 6
 6th Road race, UCI Road World Championships
1931
 1st GP Villafranca de Ordizia
 1st Subida a Urkiola
 1st GP Vizcaya
1932
 1st Overall Vuelta a la Comunidad Valenciana
1st Stages 1 & 3
 1st Clásica a los Puertos de Guadarrama
 1st GP Villafranca de Ordizia
 1st Prueba Legazpia
 2nd GP Vizcaya
 4th Road race, UCI Road World Championships
 9th Overall Volta a Catalunya
1933
 1st Stage 2 Vuelta a Pontevedra
1935
 1st GP Villafranca de Ordizia
 3rd Clásica a los Puertos de Guadarrama

References

External links
 

1902 births
1974 deaths
Spanish male cyclists
Sportspeople from the Province of Ávila
Cyclists from Castile and León
People from Ordizia
Sportspeople from Gipuzkoa
Cyclists from the Basque Country (autonomous community)